The Hungarian Open is a professional men's tennis tournament played on outdoor red clay courts. It is part of the ATP Tour 250 series of the Association of Tennis Professionals (ATP) Tour. It is held annually in April in Budapest, Hungary. This is the first ATP event hosted in Hungary and it run by the Hungarian Tennis Association. 2017 was the inaugural edition and 2019 was the last edition. Matteo Berrettini was the event's last singles champion. The tournament is replaced by the Serbia Open scheduled to return to the calendar in April 2021.

Past finals

Singles

Doubles

References

External links
 Official website

 
ATP Tour 250
Clay court tennis tournaments
Tennis tournaments in Hungary
Recurring sporting events established in 2017
2017 establishments in Hungary